Primera División de México (Mexican First Division) Clausura 2006 is a Mexican football tournament - one of two short tournaments that take up the entire year to determine the champion(s) of Mexican football. It began on Friday, January 20, 2006, and ran until April 30, when the regular season ended. Tecos and San Luis inaugurated the season with a match that resulted in a 2-1 victory for Tecos. On May 21, Pachuca defeated San Luis 1-0 and became champions for the fourth time. Although the team fielded one of two top scorers for this season, Sebastian Abreu, Dorados de Sinaloa was relegated to Primera 'A' in a dramatic last game of regular season against San Luis.

Overview

Final standings (groups)

League table

Top goalscorers 
Players sorted first by goals scored, then by last name. Only regular season goals listed.

Source: MedioTiempo

Results

Playoffs

Bracket

Quarterfinals

Pachuca won 4–3 on aggregate.

Guadalajara won 6–5 on aggregate.

San Luis won 1–0 on aggregate.

Toluca won 3–2 on aggregate.

Semifinals

4–4 on aggregate. Pachuca advanced for being the higher seeded team.

San Luis won 4–2 on aggregate.

Finals

Pachuca won 1–0 on aggregate.

Relegation

External links
 Mediotiempo.com (where information was obtained)

Mexico
Clausura